San Vendemiano is a municipality in the province of Treviso, northern  Italy,  from  Treviso.

Footballer Alessandro del Piero grew up in San Vendemiano.

Twin towns
 Nova Gorica, Slovenia, since 1973

Notable people
 Regina Dal Cin (1819 – 1897), Osteopath and bone-setter

References

Cities and towns in Veneto